Cutajar is a surname. Notable people with the surname include:
Lawrence Cutajar (born 1960), Maltese politician
Michael Cutajar (born 1971), Maltese footballer
Robert Cutajar, Maltese politician
Rosianne Cutajar (born 1988/89), Maltese politician

Maltese-language surnames